Joseph D. FitzGerald, S.J. (born in Lawrence, Massachusetts in 1899) was the 3rd president of Fairfield University located in Fairfield, Connecticut from 1951 to 1958.  During his seven-year tenure the first class of Fairfield University graduated in 1953 and the university was admitted to fully accredited membership in the New England Association of Colleges and Secondary Schools.  Also, Loyola Hall was opened in 1955, Gonzaga Hall was opened in 1957, and Canisius Hall was opened in 1957.

References

External links
Rev. Joseph D. Fitzgerald, S.J. Profile
Rev. Joseph D. Fitzgerald, S.J., the 3rd President of Fairfield University (1951-1958)

Presidents of Fairfield University
20th-century American Jesuits
People from Lawrence, Massachusetts
1899 births
Year of death missing
Catholics from Massachusetts